Rana Naved-ul-Hasan (Punjabi), 
(born 28 February 1978) is a Pakistani cricket coach and former cricketer who played all formats of the game.

A right-arm fast-medium bowler capable of generating good pace with late swing, he is a genuine strike bowler. Although he was prone to leaking runs in his earlier career, of late he has used vast county experience to be economical in death overs. He often bowls the reverse-swinging yorker in one day and T20 cricket and has good control over changes of pace, though he sometimes can be expensive. Ul-hasan is also a useful attacking lower-order batsman with 5 first-class centuries and many fifties, including a score of 95 in 57 balls in a T20 game which lifted his team Sialkot Stallions to the tournament final. He left playing cricket due to personal reasons during 1995–1999.

He also boasts an exceptional pedigree in domestic Twenty20 cricket played all around the world, having amassed 75 appearances with Sialkot Stallions, Sussex Sharks, Yorkshire Carnegie, Tasmania Tigers and Hobart Hurricanes.

County Championship winner with Sussex in 2006 and 2007, Naved is no stranger to the county game, having also represented Yorkshire in 2008 and 2009. Naved has been in KFC Twenty20 Big Bash action in Australia for Hobart Hurricanes, recently topping the tournament wicket-takers list with 15 dismissals in eight matches and gaining cult status with the nickname "The People's Mullet".

Early hockey career
Naved was initially a hockey player, playing the sport at professional and competitive level and even being part of the Pakistan Under-16 team, but abandonned it after sustaining a knee injury and being unable to run, so he chose to play tape-ball cricket.

Bowling
Naved, renowned as a specialist 'death' bowler, has a century of ODI dismissals to his name at an average of 29.28.

Now regarded as one of the best 'death' bowlers in the game, Rana Naved has the ability to vary his pace without a discernible change in action, and without losing control.  Also has the ability to bowl orthodox and reverse swing in favourable conditions.

Overseas franchises

Bangladesh Premier League
Rana was selected in the Dhaka Gladiators team in the inaugural BPL tournament, where Pakistani stars were the biggest winners, sold for a massive $100,000, $50,000 above his base price, after performing very well in the Big Bash tournament with the ball.

Big Bash League
He was the leading wicket taker in Australia's Big Bash League in the 2011–12 edition, where he claimed 15 scalps for Hobart.

Ul-hasan has been playing T20 Cricket for the Australian domestic Big Bash League teams the Tasmanian Tigers and the Hobart Hurricanes since the 2009 season. He has become a cult hero in the state and is known as "The People's Mullet" amongst the masses.

English county cricket
Since June 2005 Ul-hasan played English county cricket for Sussex, where he formed an effective partnership with fellow Pakistani bowler Mushtaq Ahmed. He has also had success with the bat, scoring a career best 139 against Middlesex.

On 12 September 2007 Ul-hasan dislocated his shoulder in a match against Durham and had to be carried off the field. This was thought to have been his last game for Sussex as the ECB brought in a rule which restricts each county to one overseas player and Sussex opted for Mushtaq Ahmed.

Ul-hasan received offers from Leicestershire and Yorkshire to remain in English County Cricket, and on 26 September 2007 signed a two-year deal with Yorkshire.

Indian Cricket League(2007-09)
He joined the Indian Cricket League (ICL) for the 2008 season, where he made a huge impact as batsman and bowler.

Rana Naved-Ul-Hasan played in Indian Cricket League for Lahore Badshahs between 2007 and 2009. He played an important role in team's success. He was the Player of the Series in the 2008-09 edition, taking 22 wickets at an average of 12.77, and an economy of 6.66, and scoring 189 runs at an average of 27, and a strike rate of 144.27.

He played a total of 26 matches for Lahore Badshahs in which he scored 367 runs at an average of 33.36, and a strike rate of 146.8, and took 40 wickets at an average of 17.68, and an economy of 7.12. Voted the '2008 Man of the Tournament' for the guiding the Lahore Badshah's to the ICL Championship, Rana Naved was arguably in a great form.

Controversy

One-year PCB ban (2010)
After a disastrous tour of Australia in January, Naved-ul-Hasan was banned for 1-year along with several other players receiving different types of consequences. However the PCB lifted his ban but he had already served six-months of his sentence. Other players implicated included Mohammad Yousuf, Younis Khan both were banned for life but had their bans lifted after two months. And Shoaib Malik was banned for one-year and had his ban lifted after serving three-months of it. And with that ban they were also fined.

International career
Ul-hasan has only made the occasional Test appearance for Pakistan with little success, having to compete with Shoaib Akhtar, Mohammad Asif, Umar Gul and Mohammad Sami for a place in the side. As a result, he has become regular in ODI. Naved's career with Pakistan saw him take 110 wickets in 74 one-day internationals between 2003 and 2010 and a career best of 6–27 versus India in 2005. The 33-year-old Pakistani bowler has good of international experience, having represented his country on 87 occasions.

Naved-ul-Hasan made his international debut at the Cherry Blossom Sharjah Cup on 4 April immediately after the poor 2003 Cricket World Cup campaign in which Pakistan were eliminated in the first round and a number of players were dropped. Playing against Sri Lanka, Rana took the wickets of Hashan Tillakaratne and Prasanna Jayawardene in consecutive balls but failed to take a hat-trick. Despite several good performances he was soon dropped from the side for alleged disciplinary problems.

With injuries to key members of the Pakistani pace attack he worked his way back into the side before once again falling out of favour with the national selectors and unable to stake a claim ahead of emerging young fast bowlers such as Umar Gul and Iftikhar Anjum. His career best figures are 6 for 27, made in a victory over India in Jamshedpur.

For his performances in 2005, he was named in the World ODI XI by the ICC.

On 22 July 2009, Rana recalled in Pakistan ODI squad for Sri Lanka as well as for the provisional 30-man squad for ICC Champions Trophy 2009 and a day later Pakistan Cricket Board awarded him a 'C' category contact.

His finest performances for Pakistan have come in ODIs against India and West Indies – 56 of his 95 wickets have come against them, but he has struggled for consistency.

Cricket academy 
Naveed-ul-Hassan has also started a cricket academy few years back after his retirement with the help some of his friend Naveed Khan and Nauman Inam. In one of the interview on a local TV channel Naveed said that his mission is to train the new generation and to produce better players.

Coaching career
In February 2023, he was appointed bowling coach to the Afghanistan team.

References

External links

 

1978 births
Living people
Punjabi people
Allied Bank Limited cricketers
Pakistan One Day International cricketers
Pakistan Test cricketers
Pakistan Twenty20 International cricketers
Sussex cricketers
ICL Pakistan XI cricketers
Lahore Badshahs cricketers
Sheikhupura cricketers
Pakistan Customs cricketers
Water and Power Development Authority cricketers
Sialkot cricketers
Yorkshire cricketers
Herefordshire cricketers
Tasmania cricketers
Derbyshire cricketers
Pakistani cricketers
Hobart Hurricanes cricketers
Cricketers from Sheikhupura
Lahore Division cricketers
Marylebone Cricket Club cricketers
Sialkot Stallions cricketers
Dhaka Dominators cricketers
Punjab (Pakistan) cricketers
Uthura Rudras cricketers
Pakistani cricket coaches